HMS Prospero was the mercantile Albion, launched at South Shields in 1800. The British Royal Navy purchased her in 1803 and converted her to a bomb vessel. She foundered in 1807 with the loss of almost her entire crew.

Albion
It has not proved possible to identify Albion in either Lloyd's Register or the Register of Shipping. Both show an Albion, of 412 tons (bm), launched at Shields in 1800. However, both also show this Albion as still trading with the West Indies as late as 1809.

This information could be stale. The registers were only as current and accurate as owners chose to keep them.

HMS Prospero
The Navy renamed Albion HMS Prospero as it had just launched a 74-gun . Prospero underwent fitting out at Deptford Dockyard between 5 November 1803 and 24 February 1804. Prospero, and  came into Portsmouth on 28 December 1803 to be fitted as bomb vessels, which work was to be done expeditiously.

Commander Salusbury Pryce Humphreys commissioned her in January 1804. In June Commander Charles Jones replaced Humphreys. On 9 April 1806 Prospero sent a vessel under American colours into the Downs.

Commander Gustavus Stupart then commanded Prospero in the Downs between 19 June 1805 and 25 August 1806. On 5 June 1806  she recaptured Autumn, Philip Pank, master.

Commander William King assumed command in September 1806.

Fate
Prospero was caught in a storm and wrecked near Dieppe on 18 February 1807. Only six members of her crew survived.

Citations and references
Citations

References

1800 ships
Ships built on the River Tyne
Age of Sail merchant ships
Merchant ships of the United Kingdom
Bomb vessels of the Royal Navy
Maritime incidents in 1807